Dmitry Vasilyevich Bobyshev (born 11 April 1936, Mariupol) is a Soviet poet, translator and literary critic.

Biography
Dmitry Bobyshev was born on 11 April 1936 in Mariupol. From his childhood he lived in Leningrad. During the Siege of Leningrad, Bobyshev's father died, and after the war he was adopted by his stepfather. In 1959 he graduated from the Leningrad Institute of Technology. He worked for 10 years as an engineer for chemical equipment. Later, he became an editor on television.

Bobyhev started to write poetry in the mid-1950s. His poems were published in samizdat (including Alexander Ginzburg's journal Syntax"). In the early 1960s, along with Joseph Brodsky, Anatoly Naiman, Yevgeny Rein, Bobyshev entered the inner circle of Anna Akhmatova. Bobyshev's first book of poems, Hiatus, was published in 1979 in Paris.

In 1979, Bobyshev emigrated to the United States, where he taught Russian language and literature. In 1983, he became a US citizen. He is currently professor emeritus at the University of Illinois at Urbana-Champaign. Bobyshev is the author of six books of poetry, a number of poetry translations (modern American poetry) and volumes of prose memoir, I am here (2003). 
 
Among the circle of Akhmatova, Bobyshev stands apart aesthetically. While, like Brodsky, he is rooted in a century and a half of Russian poetic tradition, Bobyshev chooses more radical manifestations of this tradition: odic splendor of the 18th century and futuristic find self-sufficient meaning in the sound of the word. These trends are amplified in after leaving's Bobyshev works, when they are given a new food, new realities, not run-first verse of Russian vocabulary and place names.

References

External links
  Рецензия на роман-трилогию Дмитрия Бобышева "Человекотекст". "Новый Журнал №279, 2015
   Новая литературная карта России

People from Mariupol
1936 births
Living people
Soviet emigrants to the United States
Soviet poets
Soviet male writers
Saint Petersburg State Institute of Technology alumni